There is no definitive date for the Polynesian discovery of Hawaii. However, high-precision radiocarbon dating in Hawaii using chronometric hygiene analysis, and taxonomic identification selection of samples, puts the initial such settlement of the Hawaiian Islands sometime between 1219 and 1266 A.D., originating from earlier settlements first established in the Society Islands around 1025 to 1120 A.D., and in the Marquesas Islands sometime between 1100 and 1200 A.D.

Ancient Hawaiian population 

There is still controversy about how many Native Hawaiians were living on the islands when Captain James Cook arrived in 1778. The frequently hypothesized model is that population growth was constant until James Cook's arrival, and was then halted by disease, followed by a rapid decrease. This theory relies on a hypothetical settlement date that radiocarbon dating in Hawaii has since refuted, as well as linear growth on the islands. Nevertheless, this theory is still used to support an estimate of between 800,000 and 1,000,000 people in 1778.

The constant population growth theory of Hawaii has scant support from the archaeological data and is contradicted by paleo-environmental evidence and radiocarbon dating of historical sites. Accordingly, the evidence indicates a model of arrested population growth, especially as a consequence of island life. This theory finds corroboration in archaeological censuses of abandoned habitation sites on leeward (southern and western) Hawai'i island and Kaho'olawe Island which indicate that population levels reached a peak before Cook's arrival. The arrested-growth model fits well with an estimated pre-contact-era population of between 200,000 and 250,000, derived primarily from the study of historical records.Population estimates based on an initial discovery and settlement of Hawaii settlement date, of around 1150 AD, and a proposed growth rate at the highest in the world, and relying on the paleo-environmental evidence of early human impact on the land completely contradicts the constant population growth theory. Instead, the estimated population curve can be divided into three sections, pre-settlement where there were no people, the initial settlement growth phase of approximately 100 people around 1150 AD to the population peak in 1450 of approximately 150,000 people. The third phase between 1450 and 1778 reflected a relatively stable population, where apparent declines were followed by periods of growth. 

Simply and briefly, as the population grew so did their agricultural imprint (forest clearing by burning) and building of heiau at those sites, as well as the decline of plants. The paleo-environmental data showed that during 1450-1778 the pace of construction of heiau slowed dramatically as did the clearing of agricultural land. Accordingly, the estimated population in 1778 around Cook's arrival was between 110,000 and 150,000.

Eastern contact

Pre-Western contact syphilis 
James Cook may not have been the first outsider to visit Hawaii. Diseases to which Hawaiians lacked immunity may well have already been spread. Testing of a young woman's bones buried in O'ahu, dated sometime between 1422 AD and 1664 according to radiocarbon dating, indicated that she had congenital syphilis, a disease which can leave a variety of distinctive marks on bone. Syphilis has long been surmised to have originated in the American Hemisphere, and to have been imported into Europe, following the return of Europeans from Columbus's first voyage in 1494 in Naples Italy, where its first European appearance was first recorded. That postulation is an established part of the Columbian exchange. That supposition of an American origin has, however, been recently challenged, and is being further evaluated by historians of disease, who argue that its presence in Europe may not have been detected previously. Another possible explanation for syphilis in the pre-Cook era finds reference to traditional Hawaiian accounts of foreign shipwrecks as well as the presence of metal blades seen by James Cook upon landing in Kaua'i, later presumed to be from Japanese sailors. Syphilis was introduced to Japan around 1512 by mariners who had contracted the disease while in China. By 1600, approximately 39.4% of Japanese men had contracted syphilis.

Shipwrecks 
Hawaiian tradition does not record the nationalities of the shipwrecks on Maui in Kiwi, Kona in Hawaii or Kauai (legend has it they cohabited and had children with Hawaiians) except to characterize them as white people arriving between years 1521 and 1530 AD. Many scholars, however, believed them to be Spanish. Records of Japanese sailors that were transmitted to their homeland during the Kamakura period state that Japanese boats landed at Makapu'u Point on the island of O'ahu in the year 1258. Further, in 1270, a separate group of Japanese sailors carrying sugar cane went ashore at Kahului, Maui.

Metal blades seen by James Cook in Kaua'i 
There are many parallels between Hawaiian and Japanese cultures; the similarity of Japanese knives to iron blades in the possession of Hawaiians at the time of Cook's first landing at Kaua'i is a prime example. These were thought to have developed through cultural contact, most likely through voyages from Japan to Hawaii in the period 1550–1630 AD. While there is no record of trade between Japan and Hawaii pre-1778, a statistical review of historical shipping and oceanic patterns suggests there may have been as many as a dozen drifts from Japan to Hawaii in the period between 1600 and 1778.

Western contact 

Economic and demographic factors in the 18th to 19th centuries reshaped the Kingdom of Hawaii. With unfamiliar diseases such as bubonic plague, leprosy, yellow fever, declining fertility, high infant mortality, infanticide, the introduction of alcohol, and emigration off the islands or to larger cities for trade jobs, the Native Hawaiian population fell from around 150,000 in 1778 to 71,000 by 1853. Faced with depopulation and a changing economy, Kamehameha I and others sought tradesmen, including navigators, blacksmiths, armorers, carpenters, sailmakers, etc. These men could expect to receive a gift of land and one or more native wives if they agreed to stay.

Rapid depopulation 
The rapid depopulation of the Hawaiian people is traced to many causes. Missionary William Ellis described deserted villages and abandoned enclosures which he attributed to "the frequent and desolating wars during Kamehameha's reign, the ravages of a pestilence brought in the first instance by foreign vessels, which has twice during the period [1778-1823] swept through the islands; the awful prevalence of infanticide; and the melancholy increase and destructive consequences of depravity and vice." The Hawaii State Statistician Robert C. Schmitt explained the severe depopulation as a result of declining fertility, high infant mortality, and emigration.The Hawaiians' customs and land use system also caused a downward spiral in the population from which after the diseases they could not recover. Firstly, Hawaiians practiced population control with infanticide, abortion, and the like. By one estimate by William Ellis in 1823, nearly two-thirds of babies were killed. It wasn't until 1835 and 1850 respectively that infanticide and abortion became illegal. Secondly, the family unit was centered around a "punahele" or favored child; a firstborn who would inherit the grandparent's property and continue the kupuna kin group. In this system, grandparents were responsible to then feed not only their children, but also their children's children. Further families could simply not accommodate growing unless they were ceded new lands from a kupuna group or applied for new lands with the local konohiki and paid for with renewed acts of submission. During the nineteenth century young adults found other things to do than to go into servitude as a hoa'aina (tenant). Artemas Bishop at Ewa in 1845 stated, "the young people of both sexes are idlers of a most worthless character, and dependent, in most cases, upon others for their daily food. There is scarcely a truly respectable and industrious young person of adult age, among the uneducated classes."

Ultimately the family unit in Hawaiian culture was simply formed more for replacement rather than production.

Whaling industry 
Between 1820 and 1845 American commercial involvement in Hawaii surged and so did the whaling industry. Between the first few ships in 1819 by the 1840s there some 400-500 ships which made semi-annual visits to the islands on their way back to New England Ports for provisions, recreation and labor. For instance a census of 1840 in Nantucket, Massachusetts, which was a center of whaling ships, indicates 793 Native Hawaiians had emigrated there alone.

Colonial-era immigration 
With fewer natives to work on the sugar plantations and the rapid depopulation from emigration on ships and whalers, recruiters started to fan out across Asia and Europe for more male labor. As a result, between 1850 and 1900 some 200,000 laborers from China, Japan, Korea, Philippines, Portugal, Germany, Norway and elsewhere came to Hawaii under contracts. This greatly diversified the islands. While most left the sugar plantations on schedule, Hawaii was viewed by migrants as a place to earn money rather than settle and raise families (there was only one Chinese woman per seventeen Chinese males).

In response to the rising immigration, King Kamehameha V established the Board of Immigration to control the importation of foreign labor. Although  critical that Chinese male laborers were treated like slaves and whipped, the Hawaiian government asserted that the primary purpose was population reinforcement of the labor force to combat high mortality and depopulation off the islands. By 1881, however, they were prohibiting immigration of Chinese men altogether for a period because of mistreatment and exploitation.

Despite the ban on immigration, there were still large numbers of Chinese and Japanese who stayed after their contracts ended, creating a small Chinatown in Honolulu. By 1893, Chinese and Japanese male workers represented 51.9% of the population. Once Hawaii was annexed in 1900, federal law applied and prohibited further Chinese immigration altogether. Koreans immigrated until 1905, and by 1908, a total of 180,000 Japanese workers had already arrived, though no more Japanese were allowed in after that. Ultimately, 50,000 Japanese workers remained permanently. Records from 1852 to 1875 indicate that in total, 56,720 Chinese arrived during that time period, however there were thousands of duplicates in the number of arrival records because of re-entry of those who had left the islands and returned. The first US census in 1900 put the population of Chinese at 22,296 men and 3,471 females.

Historical population

References 

Ancient Hawaii
Prehistoric migrations
Peopling of the world